Nancy A. Dunkel (born 1955) is an American politician.

Dunkel was born in 1955, in Manchester, Iowa. She was raised in Earlville and attended Loras College. Dunkel later moved to Dyersville, where she worked as a banker and in retirement, led the Dyersville Area Community Foundation. In 2011, Dunkel was elected to the Iowa Women's Hall of Fame.

Politically, Dunkel is affiliated with the Democratic Party. She ran unopposed for the open seat in District 57 of the Iowa House of Representatives in 2012, as the incumbent officeholder Jack Drake was redistricted. Dunkel defeated Republican candidate Ryan Kilburg and Libertarian candidate David Snowden Overby in 2014. After stepping down from the state legislature, Dunkel accepted a gubernatorial appointment to serve on the Iowa Board of Regents in 2017. The Iowa Senate voted unanimously to approve Dunkel's appointment.

References

Democratic Party members of the Iowa House of Representatives
Living people
People from Dyersville, Iowa
1955 births
American bankers
Loras College alumni
21st-century American women politicians
Women state legislators in Iowa
People from Manchester, Iowa
21st-century American politicians
American women bankers